Paul Hay du Chastelet (November 1592 – 26 April 1636) was a French magistrate, orator, and writer. His brother, Daniel Hay du Chastelet de Chambon, was a mathematician.

Biography
Du Chastelet was born at Laval, Mayenne, a member of the ancient house of Hay in Brittany region of France. He became a councillor in 1616 and Advocate-General of the Parliament of Brittany in 1618.

References

External links
 
 Notice biographique de l'Académie française

1592 births
1636 deaths
French rhetoricians
17th-century French writers
17th-century French male writers
French politicians